Billy Devlin (born October 7, 1969) is an American film actor and writer.

Devlin was born William Gerardo Devlin in New York City, New York and raised in the town of Wantagh, New York. As a writer, Devlin has done rewrites on Disney's Remember the Titans and Glory Road as well as having had projects in development at several major studios. He's played minor parts, most notably in films produced by Jerry Bruckheimer.

Filmography
Loser (1991) – Surfer Sage
Crimson Tide (1995) – Navigator
The Rock (1996) – Navy SEAL #6
The Paraclete (1996) – Tommy
Con Air (1997) – Guard #3
Kiss & Tell (1997) – Liam McMannis
Armageddon (1998) – Roughneck #3
Rush Hour (1998) – FBI Agent at Building
Gone in 60 Seconds (2000) – Det. Jurgens
The Shrink Is In (2001) – Uniformed Officer #2
National Treasure: Book of Secrets (2007) – Agent Sledge
The Taking of Pelham 123 (2009) – ESU Guy
G-Force (2009) – Saber's Security Guard (uncredited)

External links

1969 births
American male film actors
Male actors from New York (state)
Writers from Ithaca, New York
Living people
People from Wantagh, New York